Karen N. Horn (born 1944) is an American economist who served as the 6th president and CEO of the Federal Reserve Bank of Cleveland from 1982 to 1987. She was the first woman to lead any of the 12 regional Federal Reserve Banks.

References

1944 births
Living people
20th-century American economists
American women economists
Federal Reserve Bank of Cleveland presidents
Johns Hopkins University alumni
Pomona College alumni